"We Won't Give In" is a song by the British rock band Slade, released in 1987 as the fourth and final single from their fourteenth studio album You Boyz Make Big Noize. The song was written by lead vocalist Noddy Holder and bassist Jim Lea, and produced by Lea. It failed to reach the UK Top 100, reaching No. 121.

Background
Slade began writing and recording material for their You Boyz Make Big Noize album in 1986. That year, "We Won't Give In" was recorded for inclusion on the soundtrack of the 1986 film Knights and Emeralds, along with another Slade song "Wild Wild Party". Although the film company had hoped to release the song as a single, RCA refused to give them permission to do so. The song was included on You Boyz Make Big Noize, which was released in 1987. Having failed to achieve the expected level of commercial success, Slade reverted to the independent label, Cheapskate, for the release of their July 1987 single "You Boyz Make Big Noize".

Later in the year, the band, particularly Lea, considered releasing "We Won't Give In" as a single in the attempt to attract the Christmas market. In a 1987 fan club interview, Lea said: "I feel that it is a good idea, because whichever way you look at it, we have the wind blowing behind us at that time of year. Unfortunately, at the moment, nobody else seems to share my point of view over this and would rather keep Slade away from Christmas this year." Eventually the band agreed to release the song as a single. Released in November, "We Won't Give In" began picking up airplay on BBC Radio 1, but failed to reach the UK Top 100, stalling outside at No. 121.

In a 1988 fan club interview, drummer Don Powell said of the song's failure "I really don't know why we have problems like that. We just seem to get the token plays, but the records tend not to bite and get dropped." Describing the song as a "heavy ballad", Holder said in a 1988 interview of the "You Boyz Make Big Noize" and "We Won't Give In" singles: "Everyone we spoke to loved both of those records, but they just didn't catch on at all."

Release
"We Won't Give In" was released on 7" by Cheapskate Records in the UK only. The B-side, "Ooh La La in L.A.", was taken from You Boyz Make Big Noize.

Promotion
No music video was filmed to promote the single. In December 1987, the band performed the song on BBC One's lunchtime show Daytime Live.

Critical reception
Upon release, Kerrang! believed the song may become a big hit. They said: "It's rather slow and measured and a shade gloomy for Christmas fare, but it's good to hear Noddy Holder roaring away". In a review of You Boyz Make Big Noize, American newspaper Record-Journal commented that the song is a "primer for anybody who wants to be Jon Bon Jovi someday". In an AllMusic review of the 2007 Salvo compilation The Collection 79-87, Dave Thompson said: "Songs like "We Won't Give In" may veer a little closer to generic hard rock than Slade really ought to, but that was the sound of the '80s, just as the glam stomp was what powered their years of omnipotence."

Formats
7" Single
"We Won't Give In" - 3:38
"Ooh La La In L.A." - 3:52

Chart performance

Personnel
Slade
Noddy Holder - lead vocals
Jim Lea - keyboards, bass, backing vocals, producer of "We Won't Give In"
Dave Hill - lead guitar, backing vocals
Don Powell - drums

Additional personnel
John Punter - producer of "Ooh La La in L.A."

References

1987 singles
1987 songs
Slade songs
Songs written by Noddy Holder
Songs written by Jim Lea
Song recordings produced by Jim Lea